Erwin Friedrich Karl Rösener (2 February 1902 – 4 September 1946) was a German Schutzstaffel (SS) commander during the Nazi era. During World War II, he was responsible for mass executions of civilians in Slovenia. Rösener was put on trial for war crimes and sentenced to death on 30 August 1946, then executed by hanging on 4 September 1946. He was posthumously included in the indictment at the Nuremberg Trials for war crimes.

Early life and SS career
Rösener was born on 2 February 1902 in Schwerte, a town in the Westphalia. He joined the Nazi Party and the Sturmabteilung ("Brownshirts") paramilitary group on 6 November 1926. He applied to join the SS in October 1929 (his application was accepted in 1930). He was promoted 11 times between 1930 and 1944, eventually finishing with the rank of SS-Obergruppenführer and General of the Waffen-SS and Police. He was a member of the Freundeskreis der Wirtschaft, or "Circle of Friends of the Economy", a group of German industrialists whose aim was to raise funds for racial research within Nazi Germany. He was a close associate of SS chief Heinrich Himmler, and reported directly to him during the war.

War crimes in Yugoslavia
From the end of 1941 to the end of the war Himmler assigned Rösener as the Higher SS and Police Leader for SS-Oberabschnitt Alpenland, part of whose territory was Slovenia. Between October 1944 and the end of the war he was head of anti-Partisan warfare in Ljubljana. During both assignments he ordered the execution of civilians, hostages and prisoners of war, actions which led to his name being on the indictment for war crimes at Nuremberg.

Rösener worked closely with Leon Rupnik in fighting the Partisans, and ordered the formation of the pro-Nazi Domobranci, the Slovenian Home Guard forces on 24 September 1943.

Rösener escaped to Austria after the war but was arrested by the British and returned to Yugoslavia. He was put on trial alongside Leon Rupnik and others, and was sentenced to death on 30 August 1946. He was executed by hanging on 4 September 1946, aged 44, and was buried the same day in an unmarked grave at Ljubljana's Žale cemetery.

Gallery

References

1902 births
1946 deaths
Nazi Party politicians
Members of the Reichstag of Nazi Germany
Sturmabteilung personnel
Nazis executed by Yugoslavia by hanging
Holocaust perpetrators in Yugoslavia
SS and Police Leaders
Jewish Slovenian history
Waffen-SS personnel
SS-Obergruppenführer
Burials at Žale
Executed mass murderers